Erdis Kraja (born 7 July 2000) is a professional footballer who plays as a midfielder for  club Pescara on loan from Atalanta. Born in Italy, Kraja represents Albania at international level.

Club career
On 12 September 2020, he joined Serie C club Grosseto on loan.

On 27 July 2021, he was loaned to Serie C club Lecco. On 4 August 2022, Kraja moved on a new loan to Pescara.

International career
Kraja represents to Albania at international youth level.

Career statistics

Club

References

2000 births
Living people
Sportspeople from the Province of Brescia
Footballers from Lombardy
Albanian footballers
Italian footballers
Italian people of Albanian descent
Association football midfielders
Serie C players
Serie D players
Atalanta B.C. players
Palermo F.C. players
U.S. Grosseto 1912 players
Calcio Lecco 1912 players
Delfino Pescara 1936 players
Albania youth international footballers
Albania under-21 international footballers